CIXF-FM is a Canadian  radio station broadcasting at 101.1 FM in Brooks, Alberta. The station broadcasts a classic hits format branded as Boom 101.1 and is owned by Stingray Group.

History

The station received CRTC approval on December 19, 2003 and was launched on October 11, 2005 as 101.1 The Fox originally with a classic hits format.

On January 18, 2011, the station flipped to a hot adult contemporary format as The One @ 101.1.

In July 2017, the station changed to adult hits as Boom 101.1.

References

External links
 
 CIXF-FM history - Canadian Communications Foundation
 

Brooks, Alberta
Ixf
Ixf
Ixf
Radio stations established in 2005
2005 establishments in Alberta